Old Hill is a census-designated place (CDP) in the town of Westport, Fairfield County, Connecticut, United States. It is in the western part of the town and is bordered to the west by the city of Norwalk.

Old Hill was first listed as a CDP prior to the 2020 census.

References 

Census-designated places in Fairfield County, Connecticut
Census-designated places in Connecticut